Helena Minić-Matanić (born 8 March 1979) is a Croatian film, stage and television actress. Her debut role was in the 2003 multiple award-winning Bosnian film Remake.

Biography
Helena Minić was born in Pula. She attended a drama school in her hometown and graduated from the Academy of Performing Arts in Sarajevo in 2002.

Her first roles were in soap operas in Zagreb. She has worked in the Istrian National Theatre, and in theatres in Virovitica and Zagreb. She received the Croatian Society of Dramatic Artists award. In 2006 she was awarded Best Young Actress for the role of Donna in Dani Satire in Zagreb.

She is married to screenwriter and film director Dalibor Matanić and they have two children.

Filmography

Television roles
 Stipe u gostima as Kristina (2012) 
 Bibin svijet as nurse (2010) 
 Zakon ljubavi as Tonka Njavro (2008) 
 Mamutica as Izabela (2008) 
 Zauvijek susjedi as Ana (2007) 
 Naša mala klinika as guardian (2007) 
 Obični ljudi as Saša Kincl (2006–2007) 
 Ljubav u zaleđu as Tanja (2005–2006)

Film roles
 Lea i Darija - Dječje carstvo as mrs. in the audience (2011) 
 Jenny te voli as Nataša (2010) 
 Remake as Alma Dizdarević (2003)

Voice-over roles

References

External links

Living people
Croatian film actresses
Croatian stage actresses
Croatian television actresses
1979 births